Cheryl Ann Oteri is an American actress and comedian. Oteri, a nominee of a Primetime Emmy Award, is best known for her tenure as a cast member on the NBC sketch comedy series Saturday Night Live from 1995 to 2000.

Early life
The daughter of Gaetano Thomas Oteri, she has Italian ancestry.

Career

Saturday Night Live (1995–2000)
After moving to Los Angeles at age 25, Oteri worked at A&M Records for four years and eventually joined famed comedy troupe The Groundlings. In 1995, producers of Saturday Night Live (SNL) attended a performance with the intention of auditioning fellow Groundlings member Chris Kattan. Oteri performed a monologue during one of Kattan's costume changes, which led to her own invitation to audition for SNL, along with Kattan and fellow Groundling Will Ferrell. She was hired as a performer in September 1995 as part of an almost entirely new cast, which was brought in after the show's disastrous 1994–1995 season.

Celebrities that Oteri impersonated included Alanis Morissette, Barbara Walters, Cyndi Lauper, Mariah Carey, Marla Maples, Debbie Reynolds, Jennifer Lopez, Lisa Marie Presley, Ross Perot, Jennifer Tilly, Paula Jones, Tori Spelling, Melanie Chisholm, Jessica Simpson, Jennifer Aniston, Lacey Chabert, Fran Drescher and Katie Couric.

Original characters
Arianna, a member of The Spartan Cheerleaders (with Will Ferrell)
Rita DelVecchio, a grouchy Philadelphia woman who is mean to the neighborhood children, patterned after Oteri's tough-talking grandmother.
Cass Van Rye, the dim-witted co-host of the "Morning Latte" talk show (with Will Ferrell)
Mickey "The Dyke", a butch public-access television cable TV host (with Mark McKinney)
Nadeen, a testy employee whose catchphrase constantly orders everyone to "Simmer down now!"
Althea McMahonaman, an absurdly hyper child who is an awful passenger and disturbs public servants
Collette Reardon, a prescription pill-addict
Joy Lipton, Erotic Attic boutique owner
Adele, a vulgar and highly sexual office worker whose attempts at sexual innuendos disgust rather than attract her colleagues
Laura Zimmerman, one half of the Zimmermans, who suddenly break into rough and sexual behavior before returning to casual conversation as if nothing happened (with Chris Kattan)

2001–present 
Oteri has appeared in a number of movies, including Scary Movie, Inspector Gadget, Liar Liar, Dumb and Dumberer: When Harry Met Lloyd, Shrek the Third and Southland Tales. 

She starred in two TV pilots that did not make it to air: Loomis and With You in Spirit. Shows on which she made guest appearances include Just Shoot Me!, Strangers with Candy. She portrayed Martine, the emotionally unstable nanny on Curb Your Enthusiasm.

In 2009, Oteri became a regular voice cast in the Fox animated comedy series, Sit Down, Shut Up. She voices Helen Klench, the unappreciated librarian who often gets mistaken for objects, such as brooms or toilet brushes. The series premiered on April 19, 2009 and moved to Comedy Central in May 2010.

Oteri played a tooth fairy on Imagination Movers, a regular on the Playhouse Disney block. She starred in the AMC web series Liza Life Coach in 2010. Oteri appeared in the pilot episode of Glory Daze, which premiered on TBS on November 16, 2010. She hosted AXS TV's Gotham Comedy Live on May 26, 2016, in New York City.
 
Cheri is an occasional guest on Jeff Lewis' talk radio show on Radio Andy, the Andy Cohen channel on SiriusXM.

Filmography

Films

Television

References

External links

Living people
People from Upper Darby Township, Pennsylvania
Actresses from Pennsylvania
American film actresses
American people of Italian descent
American television actresses
American voice actresses
American women comedians
Actresses from Philadelphia
20th-century American actresses
21st-century American actresses
American sketch comedians
20th-century American comedians
21st-century American comedians
Comedians from Pennsylvania
Comedians from Los Angeles County
Cartoon Network people
Nickelodeon people  
Disney people
1962 births